Viktor Anokhin (born 18 July 1951) is a Soviet sprinter. He competed in the men's 4 × 400 metres relay at the 1976 Summer Olympics.

References

External links

1951 births
Living people
Athletes (track and field) at the 1976 Summer Olympics
Soviet male sprinters
Soviet male middle-distance runners
Olympic athletes of the Soviet Union